WVEI-FM (103.7 MHz, SportsRadio 103.7) is a radio station broadcasting a sports radio format, largely simulcasting Boston-based WEEI-FM. Licensed to Westerly, Rhode Island, United States.  The station is owned by Audacy, Inc.  In addition to WEEI programming, WVEI-FM carries Providence Friars men's basketball, Boston Bruins hockey, and ESPN Radio.  Its transmitter is in Exeter, Rhode Island but due to it being mostly a simulcast, its operations are run out of WEEI-FM's studios in Boston's Brighton neighborhood.

History

The station signed on October 17, 1967, as WERI-FM. At one time a simulcast of its sister AM station (1230 AM; now WBLQ), in the mid-1970s, WERI-FM became a totally separate station with an automated Drake/Chenault format called "Hit Parade".  Eventually, in the early 1980s, the station switched to Stereo with a live album rock format called "Number 1-04", consulted by Clark Smidt.  By the mid-1980s, after a major power upgrade, it had become "RI 104", a top 40 station.  On March 9, 1987, the station changed its call sign to WWRX, and the station shifted to an album rock format.  Though WWRX saw some success in the New London, Connecticut, market, management opted to focus on the larger Providence market, and the station moved its transmitter from West Greenwich to Exeter in 1989. The call sign was modified to WWRX-FM on February 22, 1992, concurrent with a brief period of time in which then-sister station WHIM (1110 AM; now WPMZ) discontinued its country format in favor of CNN Headline News under the WWRX call sign; however, the "-FM" suffix was not removed from 103.7 when the AM station reverted to WHIM and the country format in 1993.

WWRX-FM was acquired by Radio Equity Partners in 1995; Radio Equity Partners, in turn, was purchased by Clear Channel Communications the following year.  After Clear Channel's acquisition of AMFM Broadcasting, WWRX was divested to Stephen Mindich, owner of The Providence Phoenix, similar publications in Boston and Portland, Maine, and Boston modern rock station WFNX, in 2000.  Mindich switched the station to modern rock on September 7, initially as a simulcast of WFNX, and later, starting in 2003, on its own.

In March 2004, Mindich sold WWRX-FM to Entercom.  As a result, the station canceled its local programming on March 22 and reverted to the WFNX simulcast on a temporary basis as Entercom prepared to relaunch WWRX with the WEEI simulcast.  The change of simulcast partners took effect on-air April 16, and the station was renamed WEEI-FM.  The call letters were changed to WVEI-FM on September 14, 2011.

References

External links

VEI-FM
Sports radio stations in the United States
Radio stations established in 1967
1967 establishments in Rhode Island
Audacy, Inc. radio stations
CBS Sports Radio stations